The Buffalo Bisons were a professional ice hockey team representing Buffalo, New York, although they played home games in nearby Fort Erie, Ontario, Canada, at the 5,000-seat Peace Bridge Arena.

History
The Bisons were founded in the Canadian Professional Hockey League for the 1928–29 season. The Bisons transferred to the International Hockey League for the next season. Buffalo were IHL league champions in 1931–32 and 1932–33, winning the F. G. "Teddy" Oke Trophy.

On March 17, 1936, the Bisons lost their home arena due to damage caused by thirteen inches of wet snow deposited by an early Spring storm. The arena (only eight years old at the time) was designed with a "Lamella Trussless" roof to improve indoor sightlines, and reduce support frames obstructing the view. The structure proved to be too weak and collapsed under the weight of the snow. The Bisons played the remainder of the 1935–36 season on the road.

The Bisons joined the International-American Hockey League for the 1936–37 season. The team started the season playing in an arena in Niagara Falls, Ontario. It soon became clear that they wouldn't be able to make a profit and pay players' salaries from ticket sales in the smaller facility. The club permanently ceased operations on December 6, 1936, after playing just eleven games with a record of 3–8–0.

The original Bisons were replaced in 1940 when the Syracuse Stars relocated to Buffalo, becoming the new Bisons team, after the construction of Buffalo Memorial Auditorium on the American side of the border. The new Bisons played from 1940 to 1970, when the current Buffalo Sabres were founded.

Season-by-season results
 Buffalo Bisons 1928–1929 (Canadian Professional Hockey League)
 Buffalo Bisons 1929–1936 (International Hockey League)
 Buffalo Bisons 1936 (International-American Hockey League)

Regular season

† Points not awarded for tied games during 1934–35 International Hockey League season.

Playoffs

External links
 History of the Buffalo (Ft. Erie) Bisons
Canadian Professional Hockey League (1928-29)International Hockey League (1929-36)
International-American Hockey League, 1936

Sports in Buffalo, New York
Ice hockey clubs established in 1928
Ice hockey clubs disestablished in 1936
International Hockey League (1929–1936) teams